One Jug of Wine, Two Vessels is a collaborative split EP by Bright Eyes and Neva Dinova. It was released in 2004 on Crank! Records. It was also reissued on CD/LP/Digital by Saddle Creek Records on March 23, 2010, with four newly recorded bonus tracks not included on the original release, which were written/recorded in late 2009.

Track listing

 "Spring Cleaning" was written by Bright Eyes and performed by Neva Dinova

Musicians
Nick White - keyboards
Gretta Cohn - cello
Casey Scott - whistling
Doug Wray - bass, engineering
Orenda Fink - trumpet
Mike Mogis - bass, banjo, guitar
John Hischke - saxophone
Conor Oberst - vocals, guitar
Bo Anderson - drums
Roger Lewis - drums
Jake Bellows - vocals, guitar
Heath Koontz - bass
Tim Haes - guitar
Mike Kratky - guitar
Nate Walcott - organ, piano, keyboards, trumpet
Corina Escamilla - piano, vocals

Charts

References

Split EPs
2004 EPs
Bright Eyes (band) EPs